This is a list of notable Iranian-Americans of all Iranian ethnic backgrounds, including both original immigrants who obtained American citizenship and their American descendants.

To be included in this list, the person must have a Wikipedia article showing they are Iranian-American or must have references showing they are Iranian American.

 Academia and science 

 Arts and entertainment 

 Business and technology 

 Literature 

 Media and journalism 

 Music 

 Politics 

 Sports 

 Religion 
 Shua'u'llah Behai, known in the Baháʼí tradition as "Mirza Shua'u’llah". Eldest grandson of Bahá'u'lláh, the founder-prophet of the Baháʼí Faith, and son of Mírzá Muhammad `Alí. Only known descendant of the Baháʼí prophet to have become an American citizen
Jacob David, pastor and relief worker
David Shofet, founder and chief rabbi of the Nessah Synagogue in Beverly Hills, California. Son of former chief rabbi of Iran Yedidia Shofet and current recognized spiritual leader of Persian Jewry
 Yedidia Shofet, former chief rabbi of Iran and spiritual leader of worldwide Persian Jewry
 Ahmad Sohrab, Baháʼí, author who served as Abdu'l-Bahá's secretary and interpreter (1912–1919). Co-founder of the New History Society'' and Caravan of East and West in New York City, which aimed to spread the teachings of the Baháʼí Faith through international correspondence and education. Ex-communicated from the Baháʼí Faith by Shoghi Effendi in 1939

Other 
 Gelareh Bagherzadeh, Iranian residing in Houston, Texas, killed in 2012 in an honor killing perpetrated by Ali Irsan
Reza Zadeh, computer science

See also
 Modern Iranian scientists and engineers
 US-Iran relations
 List of British Iranians
 List of Iranian artists
 List of Iranian women artists
 List of Iranians

References

American
Iranian
American